Arsenio Linares y Pombo (22 October 1848 – 7 August 1914) was a Spanish military officer and government official. Born in Valencia, he earned the rank of lieutenant in 1868 and participated in operations against rebellions in Cuba, and in the Carlist Wars on mainland Spain putting down rebellions by Basque separatists. He occupied posts in the Philippines, Madrid, and Melilla, and later returned to Cuba. Linares described himself as passionately loyal to King Alfonso XIII. He was an antisemite and a white supremacist, in his memoirs (published 1906) he made numerous disparaging remarks about Jewish people as well as people of African descent. Ideologically Linares said he was opposed to democracy, which he believed was a "flawed idea." On this basis he supported the coup d'état led by Arsenio Martínez Campos to overthrow the First Spanish Republic and restore the monarchy.

He organized the defense of Santiago de Cuba during the Battle of San Juan Hill.  Linares failed to reinforce this position, choosing to hold nearly 10,000 Spanish reserves in the city of Santiago. Spanish entrenchments, crucial to the defense of the city, had been poorly constructed. Rather than being on the forward or military crest of the San Juan Height where they could have a clear field of fire all the way down the hill, they were constructed on the hilltop, itself allowing the Americans to escape even near point-blank rifle volleying when they went below the Spanish soldiers lines of observation.

After the Battle of San Juan Hill Pombo wrote to his commander: "The situation is fatal; surrender inevitable; we are only prolonging the agony; the sacrifice is useless."

He was named Minister of War in 1900 by Prime Minister Francisco Silvela, and occupied this post under subsequent governments. He was appointed senator for life in 1900. In 1909, his call-up of troops from Catalonia to be sent to Morocco led to the Tragic Week in Barcelona. He died in Madrid in 1914.

References

Sources
 Arsenio Linares y Pombo

1848 births
1914 deaths
People from Valencia
Spanish generals
Spanish military personnel of the Third Carlist War (Governmental faction)
Spanish military personnel of the Spanish–American War
Spanish monarchists
Far-right politics in Spain
Antisemitism in Spain